Aman Kumar Nagra (born 10 May 1955 at Tapu Kamalpur, Yamuna Nagar district) was member of 12th Lok Sabha from Ambala constituency in Haryana as member of Bahujan Samaj Party. He defeated Suraj Bhan of Bharatiya Janata Party by 2,864 votes in the 1998 Lok Sabha elections. He founded the Manav Samaj Seva Party on 12 May 2002.

References

1955 births
People from Yamunanagar district
India MPs 1998–1999
Haryana politicians
Lok Sabha members from Haryana
Living people
Bahujan Samaj Party politicians
Haryana Vikas Party politicians